Eastern Area was a railway branch line built in the 1910s to service the State Coal Mine (Eastern Precinct) located in Wonthaggi. The Eastern Area Mine operated from 1919 to 1947 while this section of track operated until the 1950s.

The short section of line extended approximately 2 km beyond Wonthaggi Railway Station which was the terminus of the Wonthaggi Line.

This branch was closed at a time when the Victorian Railways was closing a number of other small branch lines and stations around Victoria.

References

Closed regional railway lines in Victoria (Australia)
Transport in Gippsland (region)
Bass Coast Shire